Grégory Lescot (born 10 May 1989) is a French Guianan professional footballer who plays as a defender for Championnat National 2 club Vannes and the French Guiana national team.

International career 
Lescot made his international debut for French Guiana in 2009. He was part of the squad that participated at the 2017 CONCACAF Gold Cup.

Notes

References

External links 

 
 

1989 births
Living people
Sportspeople from Cayenne
French Guianan footballers
French footballers
French people of French Guianan descent
Black French sportspeople
Association football defenders
CSC de Cayenne players
Tours FC players
Thouars Foot 79 players
FC Chartres players
C'Chartres Football players
Vannes OC players
Championnat National 3 players
Division d'Honneur players
Championnat National 2 players
French Guiana international footballers
2017 CONCACAF Gold Cup players